Purefoy is the surname of:
James Purefoy (born 1964), English actor
Robert Purefoy, also Robert Parfew (d. 1557), bishop of Hereford
William Purefoy (c. 1580–1659), one of the regicides of Charles I of England
George Purefoy-Jervoise (1770–1847), English politician

See also
Wilfred Bagwell-Purefoy (1862–1930), British breeder of racehorses